The second season of The Bachelorette, an ABC reality television series, premiered on January 14, 2004. This season featured 28-year-old Meredith Phillips, a makeup artist from Portland, Oregon.

Phillips finished in third place on season 4 of The Bachelor featuring Bob Guiney. The season concluded on February 26, 2004, with Phillips accepting a proposal from 28-year-old equity research salesman Ian McKee. They ended their engagement in February 2005.

Contestants

Call-Out Order

 Episode 7 was a special "Men Tell All" episode.

 The contestant was eliminated at the rose ceremony
 The contestant won the competition

Meredith Phillips
Meredith Phillips is a make-up artist, model, and former contestant on the fourth season of ABC's The Bachelor. After the show, she published Date Night Cookbook.

Episodes

References

2004 American television seasons
The Bachelorette (American TV series) seasons
Television shows filmed in California
Television shows filmed in New York (state)
Television shows filmed in Texas